Guacamelee! is a Metroidvania action platforming video game developed and published by DrinkBox Studios, initially launched in April 2013 for platforms PlayStation 3 and PlayStation Vita and was later ported to Microsoft Windows in August and to OS X and Linux in February 2014. An enhanced edition entitled Super Turbo Championship Edition was released for Wii U, Windows, PlayStation 4, Xbox One and Xbox 360 in July 2014 and later on the Nintendo Switch in October 2018. The game draws its inspiration from traditional Mexican culture and folklore.

A sequel, Guacamelee! 2, which includes four player co-operative gameplay, was released on August 21, 2018.

Gameplay 

Guacamelee! is a hybrid 2D Metroidvania style action platform and brawler. Players control the luchador Juan and explore an open, non-linear world to complete the central story objectives while collecting necessary character upgrades and battling enemies. Coins collected from defeated enemies are used to buy new skills at shops, which also double as checkpoints. The game features drop-in co-op play, with the second player assuming the role of Tostada, Guardian of the Mask.

As players progress through the game, Juan breaks open "Choozo statues", a direct reference to Metroid'''s "Chozo statues", to gain new abilities. Some abilities give Juan new combat options with each move's color corresponding to similarly colored obstacles in the world, requiring Juan to learn specific moves before accessing certain areas. Other abilities include movement upgrades, such as a double jump, a chicken transformation to traverse small corridors, and the ability to cross between the world of the living and the world of the dead to access areas and combat enemies that reside in one plane.

 Plot 
Just outside the small Mexican village of Pueblucho, Juan Aguacate is a humble agave farmer. On the Dia de los Muertos (Day of the Dead), he goes into town to meet with his childhood friend and love interest, El Presidente's daughter, Lupita. An evil charro skeleton named Carlos Calaca attacks the village and kidnaps her from el Presidente's Mansion. Juan confronts Carlos but is no match and is killed. He is sent to the land of the dead, a parallel world where the dead reside. There, Juan finds a mysterious luchadora named Tostada. She gives Juan a mystical mask that transforms him into a powerful luchador and brings him back to the world of the living. The game then follows Juan's battle to rescue his beloved and to stop Calaca's plan to sacrifice her in a ritual that would unite the worlds of living and dead under his rule.

While he confronts X'tabay, the first of Calaca's lieutenants, he ends up transformed into a rooster and brought back to human form by another rooster with mysterious powers. After defeating X'tabay, she reforms, revealing that Calaca was once a great rodeo man who broke his arm just before an important competition, and sold his soul to the Devil to have it healed time enough for the competition, but just after winning, the Devil enacts his payment and drags him to hell, but with X'tabay's help he deceived the Devil by having him transformed into the same kind of rooster as Juan, having helped him against Calaca in order to restore his power.

Juan gains power to confront and defeat the rest of Calaca's forces. Juan pursues Calaca to the altar where the ceremony is being held and defeats him, but does not arrive in time to save Lupita. In the normal ending, Juan returns to his village and lives his life in peace until reuniting with Lupita in the afterlife and the mask disappears. In the true ending, attained if the player clears all the hidden trials, Lupita is revived by the power of Juan's mask which breaks apart, and the two return together to the village where they get married.

 Development and release 

The game was originally released for PlayStation 3 and PlayStation Vita in April 2013, with cross-buy support and additional missions and costumes released as downloadable content (DLC). Guacamelee! Gold Edition, released on Steam in August, includes the previously released DLC, as well as Steam Workshop support, allowing players to create their own character skins using Adobe Flash and share them online. This version was later released for OS X and Linux in February 2014. Guacamelee! Super Turbo Championship Edition, which adds additional levels and bosses in addition to previous DLC, was released for PlayStation 4, Xbox One, Windows, Xbox 360, and Wii U in July 2014. The game was a PlayStation Plus free title for subscribers during May 2015. The idea behind the Mexican theme was originally proposed by the animator.

Former IGN editor Colin Moriarty is credited with advising DrinkBox to add D-pad movement to the control scheme, earning a special thanks in the game's end credits.

The Nintendo Switch version released was on 8 October 2018, with DrinkBox's plans to also bring the sequel Guacamelee! 2 to the Switch before the end of 2018.

 Physical edition 
In July 2015, DrinkBox Studios teamed with the subscription box company, IndieBox, to distribute an exclusive, custom-designed, individually-numbered physical release of Guacamelee! This limited collector's box included a flash-drive with a DRM-free game file, official soundtrack, instruction manual, Steam key, and various custom-made collectibles.

In August 2017, Vblank Entertainment released a limited retail version of Guacamelee! Super Turbo Championship Edition for the PlayStation 4. This release was limited to 3,800 copies.

 Reception Guacamelee! was selected as a nominee at Indiecade in August 2012. The game was also nominated for the 2013 Independent Games Festival for Excellence in Visual Art. IGN gave the game a 9.0, citing that the game's only misfire was the short length.

In popular culture
Juan was planned to appear as a playable cameo character in the incomplete Wii U and PC game Hex Heroes. Both Juan and Tostada appear as playable "guest-star" characters in the Wii U game Runbow. Juan appears in Indivisible as a guest character. Juan also appears as a playable character in the fighting game Brawlout. He was also added to Dead Cells''.

References

External links

 
 

2013 video games
Action video games
Cooperative video games
DrinkBox Studios games
Indie video games
Linux games
MacOS games
Metroidvania games
Multiplayer and single-player video games
Nintendo Switch games
Platform games
PlayStation 3 games
PlayStation 4 games
PlayStation Network games
PlayStation Vita games
Side-scrolling video games
Video games developed in Canada
Video games scored by Rom Di Prisco
Video games set in Mexico
Video games with Steam Workshop support
Wii U eShop games
Windows games
Xbox 360 Live Arcade games
Xbox One games